Mikayil Huseyn oglu Abdullayev (19 December 1921, Baku - 22 August 2002, Baku) was an Azerbaijani painter, a People's Artist of the former USSR since 1963, and creator of a series of paintings entitled Through India.

Abdullayev was an alumnus of the Azimzadeh Azerbaijan Painting School (1939) and the Surikov Moscow State Painting Institute (1949). During his trips to India, Afghanistan, Hungary, Poland, Italy and other countries from 1956 through 71, Abdullayev painted Bengali Girls, Rajasthani Women, An Old Afghan, as well as portraits of Zsigmond Kisfaludi Stróbl, Renato Guttuso, Giacomo Manzù among others. Among portraits of Azerbaijani people, there are those of Uzeyir Hajibeyov, Samad Vurgun, Mirza Fatali Akhundov and Farhad Badalbeyli. Abdullayev's paintings were exhibited in cities such as Paris, London, Berlin, Montreal, Prague, Budapest, Belgrade, Sofia, Warsaw, Delhi, Cairo, Brussels. Abdullayev was also the designer of artistic panel in the Nizami Station of Baku Metro.

The Tolga family is the main collector of the 532 Abdullayev paintings in Turkey.

Notable works
1947 - An Evening
1948 - Mingachevir Lights
1951 - Builders of Happiness
1956 - Sevinj
1963-65 - On the Fields of Azerbaijan triptych
1964 - On the Absheron
1982 - Khachmaz Girls

References

External links

Story of Abdullayev

Azerbaijani portrait painters
Artists from Baku
1921 births
2002 deaths
Recipients of the Istiglal Order
20th-century Azerbaijani painters
Recipients of the Order of Lenin
Soviet painters
Honored Art Workers of the Azerbaijan SSR